Gonabad (also Romanized as Gonābād; also known as Gūnābād) is a village in Miyan Velayat Rural District, in the Central District of Mashhad County, Razavi Khorasan Province, Iran. At the 2006 census, its population was 531, in 152 families.

References 

Populated places in Mashhad County